A Kind of Loving is a 1962 British kitchen sink drama film directed by John Schlesinger, based on the 1960 novel of the same name by Stan Barstow. It stars Alan Bates and June Ritchie as two lovers in early 1960s Lancashire. The photography was by Denys Coop, and the music by Ron Grainer. Filming locations included the towns of Preston, Blackburn, Bolton, Salford, Manchester, Radcliffe and St Anne's-on-Sea in the northwest of England.

The film belongs to the British New Wave movement in film, and the related genre commonly known as "kitchen sink drama". The novel was later adapted into the 1982 television series A Kind of Loving.

Plot summary 
Victor 'Vic' Brown (Bates) is a draughtsman in a Manchester factory who sleeps with a typist called Ingrid Rothwell (Ritchie) who also works there. She falls for him but he is less enamoured of her. When he learns he has made her pregnant Vic proposes marriage and the couple move in with Ingrid's protective, domineering mother, Mrs Rothwell (Thora Hird), who disapproves of the match. Ingrid has a miscarriage, Vic has regrets and comes home drunk. The couple then consider the possibility of making do with 'a kind of loving'.

Cast
 Alan Bates as Victor Arthur 'Vic' Brown 
 Thora Hird as Mrs. Rothwell 
 June Ritchie as Ingrid Rothwell
 Bert Palmer as Mr. Geoffrey Brown 
 Pat Keen as Christine Harris 
 James Bolam as Jeff 
 Jack Smethurst as Conroy 
 Gwen Nelson as Mrs. Brown 
 John Ronane as Draughtsman 
 David Mahlowe as David Harris 
 Patsy Rowlands as Dorothy 
 Michael Deacon as Les 
 Annette Robertson as Phoebe 
 Fred Ferris as Althorpe 
 Leonard Rossiter as Whymper 
 Malcolm Patton as Jim Brown 
 Harry Markham as Railwayman 
 Peter Madden as Registrar
 David Cook as Draughtsman (uncredited)
 Joe Gladwin as Bus Conductor (uncredited) 
 Norman Heyes as Laisterdyke (uncredited)
 Bryan Mosley as Bus Conductor (uncredited)
 Kathy Staff as Mrs Oliphant (uncredited)

Reception
It was the sixth most popular film at the British box office in 1962. According to Kinematograph Weekly the film was considered a "money maker" at the British box office in 1962.

Awards 
The film won the Golden Bear award at the 12th Berlin International Film Festival in 1962.

References

External links 
 
 
 

1962 films
1962 drama films
1960s English-language films
British black-and-white films
British drama films
Films directed by John Schlesinger
Films based on British novels
Films set in Manchester
Films shot in Greater Manchester
Golden Bear winners
Social realism in film
Films scored by Ron Grainer
1962 directorial debut films
1960s British films